Leptocheliidae is a family of malacostracans in the order Tanaidacea. There are more than 30 genera and 140 described species in Leptocheliidae.

Genera
These 32 genera belong to the family Leptocheliidae:

 Alloleptochelia Gutu, 2016
 Antiparus Gutu, 2016
 Araleptochelia Błażewicz-Paszkowycz & Bamber, 2012
 Bassoleptochelia Błażewicz-Paszkowycz & Bamber, 2012
 Bathyleptochelia Larsen, 2003
 Brunarus Bamber & Marshall, 2015
 Cacoheterotanais Morales-Núñez & Heard, 2015
 Catenarius Bamber, 2008
 Chondrochelia Gutu, 2016
 Cocotanais Esquete, 2013
 Ektraleptochelia Bamber & Marshall, 2015
 Grallatotanais Gutu & Iliffe, 2001
 Hargeria Lang, 1973
 Heterotanais G. O. Sars, 1882
 Heterotanoides Sieg, 1978
 Intermedichelia Gutu, 1996
 Kalloleptochelia Gutu, 2016
 Konarus Bamber, 2006
 Larsmentia Bamber & Marshall, 2015
 Leptochelia Dana, 1849
 Makassaritanais Gutu, 2012
 Makraleptochelia Araujo-Silva & Larsen, 2012
 Mesotanais Dollfus, 1897
 Metaleptochelia Gutu, 2016
 Neoleptochelia Gutu, 2011
 Nuberis Bamber & Marshall, 2015
 Ogleus Morales-Núñez & Heard, 2013
 Parakonarus Bird, 2011
 Paraleptochelia Gutu, 2016
 Poorea Edgar, 2012
 Pseudoleptochelia Lang, 1973
 Pseudonototanais Lang, 1973

Notes

References

Further reading

External links

 

Tanaidacea
Crustacean families